Vitali Sazonets (born 8 March 1988 in Dnipro) is a Ukrainian former competitive figure skater. He is the 2008 national champion and reached the free skate at four ISU Championships – 2004 Junior Worlds in The Hague, Netherlands; 2005 Junior Worlds in Kitchener, Ontario, Canada; 2006 Junior Worlds in Ljubljana, Slovenia; and 2008 Europeans in Zagreb, Croatia.

Programs

Results
JGP: Junior Grand Prix

References

External links

Navigation

Ukrainian male single skaters
1988 births
Living people
Sportspeople from Dnipro
Competitors at the 2009 Winter Universiade